Vittorio Magnelli (born 4 September 1957) is a former professional tennis player from Italy.

Career
Magnelli took part in the main draw of the 1981 French Open and faced Paraguayan Victor Pecci in the first round. Pecci won the match in straight sets.

He is now a tennis coach and was working with Gréta Arn when she won the 2011 ASB Classic. Formerly, he was coach of Sandrine Testud, whom he married in 1998.

References

1957 births
Living people
Italian male tennis players
Italian tennis coaches
20th-century Italian people